Innebandyklubb Dalen, abbreviated IBK Dalen, is a floorball club from the town of Umeå in the north of Sweden. Their men's and women's team both play in the top-tier league in Sweden, known as the Swedish Super League (women's, men's). They travel about 300 miles to their nearest away match.

The 2022–2023 season saw the men's team being relegated from the Swedish Superleague following 26 seasons in a row in the Swedish top division.

Men's Roster 
As of August 27th, 2020

References

Sports teams in Sweden
Swedish floorball teams
1990 establishments in Sweden
Sports clubs established in 1990